On the Juche Idea is a treatise attributed to North Korean leader Kim Jong-il on the North Korean Juche ideology. It is considered the most authoritative work on Juche.

The work, although probably ghostwritten for him, legitimized Kim as the sole bona fide interpreter of the ideology. The treatise systemizes Kim Jong-il and his father Kim Il-sung's thought on the Juche philosophy. The treatise marks Juches departure from the materialism of Marxism–Leninism and posits the consciousness of the massess as dependent on the working class leader.

According to Kim Jong-il, the Juche idea is composed of a philosophical principle, socio-historical principles, and guiding principles. The philosophical principle can be summarized with Kim Il-sung's maxim that "man is the master of everything and decides everything." The socio-historical principles entail that the working masses are the subject of history. The guiding principles are: independent stance, creative method, and giving precedence to ideological consciousness. Emphasis on independence in particular has given raise to Kim's Songun, or military first, politics.

Background 
On the Juche Idea is one of Kim Jong-il's major writings on Juche and considered the most authoritative work on it. It is a standard textbook on the subject. The treatise is a systematization of both President Kim Il-sung and Kim Jong-il's thought on Juche philosophy and offers the most comprehensive account of Juche. Kim Il-sung's thought in particular began to be formulated as an original philosophy from the 1970s onward. On the Juche Idea was sent to the national seminar on the Juche idea on 31 March 1982 held on the occasion of the 70th birth anniversary of Kim Il-sung (15 April). The occasion was also honored with the unveiling of the Juche Tower in Pyongyang.

In the treatise, Kim Jong-il links the birth of the Juche idea to Kim Il-sung's personal history as a guerrilla fighter during the anti-Japanese struggle. On the Juche Idea thus furthered Kim Il-sung's cult of personality. Publishing the treatise helped Kim Jong-il to gain legitimacy, particularly emphasizing his intellectual prowess. At the time of writing Kim Jong-il was working as the ideological chief of the country on behalf of his father. Although it was probably ghostwritten for him, by being named as the author Kim Jong-il became the "one and only bona fide interpreter of the 'immortal Juche idea' of Kim Il Sung."

Content 

Kim Jong-il explains that Juche is a departure from Marxism–Leninism rather than simply a reinterpretation of it. According to Kim, Juche offers not only an "independent and creative" direction to the Korean revolution, but also establishes a new era for human history. It is philosophically idealist as opposed to the materialism of Marxism. The work is considered somewhat abstract in style.

In comparison to Kim Il-sung's writings, Kim Jong-il pays particular attention to consciousness and the concept of the leader. These two are often linked. According to Charles K. Armstrong, the main message of the treatise is that "regardless of material circumstances, the masses owe unquestioning obedience to the Great Leader, who alone can bring the masses to consciousness", adding that the "message would be extremely useful for the North Korean state in the difficult years ahead", referring to the death of Kim Il-sung and the North Korean famine in the 1990s, a decade after the publication of On the Juche Idea.

In On the Juche Idea, Kim Jong-il divides Juche into three components: the philosophical principle, the socio-historical principles, and the guiding principles of  the Juche idea.

Philosophical principle 
The philosophical principle entails that Juche is a man-centered philosophy. Man has independence(자주성,Chajusong), (창조성,Changjosong) and (의식성,Uisiksong), which places man at the center of the world. This is described by the maxim coined by Kim Il-sung in a 1972 interview with Japanese journalists: "man is the master of everything and decides everything." Man transforms the world and embodies , or independence and autonomy. By putting man at the center, Kim Jong-il denies the existence of any supernatural power, although the Juche philosophy itself can be said to have quasi-religious elements.

Socio-historical principles 
The socio-historical principles of Juche can be summarized as follows: the working masses are the subject of history. Human history is the struggle of the masses to realize their independence and defend it. Man's socio-historical mission is to transform both nature and society. Here Kim departs from Marxism–Leninism by primarily setting man against nature rather than the proletariat against the bourgeois class.

Guiding principles 
There are three guiding principles in Juche:
First, independent stance means Juche in ideology, independence in politics, self-sufficiency in economy and self-reliance in defense. These four aspects of the independent stance can be already found in Kim Il-sung's 1965 speech given in Indonesia, On Socialist Construction in the Democratic People's Republic of Korea and the South Korean Revolution(조선민주주의인민공화국에서의사회주의건설과남조선혁명에대하여). Even though On the Juche Idea mentions economy, it is not given precedence. Words like "development" and "growth" are more often used to refer to ideology rather than economy. However, noting that an economy built on "self-reliance does not mean building an economy in isolation", Kim does hint at limited economic reforms. Sure enough, a law on joint-ventures was passed in 1984.
The second principle, creative method, means that all problems arising in the revolution and construction are to be solved by relying on the creativity of the masses.
The third and final guiding principle is giving precedence to ideological consciousness over all other work.

Legacy 
On the Juche Idea has been since used as a justification for Kim Jong-il's Songun, or army-first, politics. The justification can be found in an aspect of one of the guiding principles of Juche, which Kim has "elevated": self-reliance in defense. Kim went on to publish "The Workers' Party of Korea Is a Juche-type Revolutionary Party which Inherited the Glorious Tradition of the DIU" in October 1982 and focusing in it more on Kim Il-sung's guerrilla activities.

See also 

Kim Jong-il bibliography
On the Art of the Cinema – Kim Jong-il's application of Juche on art and literature
On Eliminating Dogmatism and Formalism and Establishing Juche in Ideological Work – Kim Il-sung's "Juche Speech"
With the Century – Kim Il-sung's autobiography

References

Works cited

Further reading 

  – contains the full text and other works
  – contains the full text and other works
  – a companion book
  – a companion book

External links 
Full text of On the Juche Idea at Publications of the DPRK

1982 non-fiction books
Marxist books
Korean philosophy
Works by Kim Jong-il
Korean non-fiction books
North Korean books
Ideology of the Workers' Party of Korea